Malcolm Charles Bert (December 4, 1902 – March 18, 1973) was an American art director. He was nominated for two Academy Awards in the category Best Art Direction.

Selected filmography
Bert was nominated for two Academy Awards for Best Art Direction:
 A Star Is Born (1954)
 Auntie Mame (1958)

References

External links

1902 births
1973 deaths
American art directors
People from Westlake Village, California